Bengali wedding may refer to:

 Bengali Muslim wedding 
Bengali Hindu Wedding